Nassach is a river of Baden-Württemberg, Germany.

Its upstream is called Lochbach. It is a right tributary of the Fils near Uhingen.

See also
List of rivers of Baden-Württemberg

References

Rivers of Baden-Württemberg
Rivers of Germany